Jorge Rojas may refer to:

Jorge A. Rojas (born 1940), Mexican leader in The Church of Jesus Christ of Latter-day Saints
Jorge Rojas (Venezuelan footballer) (born 1977), Venezuelan footballer
Jorge Rojas (Spanish footballer) (born 1983), Spanish footballer
Jorge Rojas (Paraguayan footballer) (born 1993), Paraguayan footballer
Jorge Rojas (Bolivian footballer) (born 1993), Bolivian footballer
Jorge Rojas (lawyer), Costa Rican lawyer and politician, head of the Judicial Investigation Agency.
Jorge Rojas (poet), Colombian poet and first director of the Colombian Institute of Culture